Ibn Shakrun or Abu Mohammed Abd al-Kadir ibn al-Arabi al-Munabbahi al-Madaghri ibn Shakrun al-Miknasi (died after 1727/28) was a Moroccan physician and poet and contemporary of Moulay Ismael. He wrote a commentary on a book of grammar, works of poetry and an urjuza (verse composition) on dietetics, hygiene and therapies, Al-Urjuza al-Shaqruniyya fi ilm al-tibb known as simply Shakruniyya, which has remained a well-known work in Morocco for considerable time. He is also the author of a risala titled al-Nafha al-wardiyya fi l'-ushba al-kindiyya on sarsaparilla and the treatment of syphilis.
He is not to be confused with Abd al-Qadir ibn Shaqrun al-Fasi (died 1801 or 1804), a religious scholar from Fes, who played an active role in the accession of Mulay Slimane as a member of the so-called ahl al-hadith group.

References

M. Lakhdar, La vie intellectuelle au maroc, Rabat 1971, pp. 161–6
Tazi, Badi (annotations), La médecine arabe au XVIIIe siècle à travers al "Urdjuza Ash-Shakruniyya" (bil. ar-fr)., 1984 (originally presented as the author's thesis (duktūrāh), Jāmiʻat Muhammad al-Khāmis, Rabat, 1980) 

Moroccan writers
17th-century Moroccan physicians
18th-century Moroccan physicians
Linguists from Morocco
Year of birth unknown
1728 deaths